Bernt Nilsson (born 22 August 1939) is a Swedish former swimmer. He competed in the men's 200 metre breaststroke at the 1960 Summer Olympics.

References

External links
 

1939 births
Living people
Olympic swimmers of Sweden
Swimmers at the 1960 Summer Olympics
Swimmers from Gothenburg
Swedish male breaststroke swimmers
20th-century Swedish people
21st-century Swedish people